Raymond George McLenaghan (born 14 April 1939) is a Canadian theoretical physicist and mathematician. With Carminati, he is known for Carminati–McLenaghan invariants.

Notes

External links

1939 births
Canadian mathematicians
Canadian physicists
Relativity theorists
Theoretical physicists
Alumni of the University of Cambridge
Living people